Jasenko Omanović (born 1967) is a Swedish politician and former member of the Riksdag, the national legislature. A member of the Social Democratic Party, he represented Västernorrland County between October 2006 and September 2018, and between September 2021 and September 2022. He was a substitute member of the Riksdag for Stefan Löfven between September 2018 to August 2021.

Omanović is the son of Sakib Omanovic and economist Bekira Omanovic (née Dolic) He studied electrical engineering in Banja Luka, Bosnia and Herzegovina. He fled to Sweden as a refugee during the Bosnian War. He has been a member of the municipal council in Härnösand Municipality since 2002.

References

1967 births
Bosnia and Herzegovina emigrants to Sweden
Living people
Members of the Riksdag 2006–2010
Members of the Riksdag 2010–2014
Members of the Riksdag 2014–2018
Members of the Riksdag 2018–2022
Members of the Riksdag from the Social Democrats
People from Härnösand Municipality